Douglas Todd Staples (born August 24, 1963) 
is the former two-term Texas Commissioner of Agriculture. He unsuccessfully ran for the Republican nomination for lieutenant governor in 2014.

On September 18, 2014, Staples announced that he would resign by mid-November to become president of the Texas Oil & Gas Association, following a controversy surrounding his views on a "Meatless Monday" campaign being adopted by some Texas schools.

Background
Staples was reared in Palestine, the seat of government of his native Anderson County in East Texas. He graduated from Palestine High School, where he was an active member of the Future Farmers of America. While in college, he served from 1981 to 1982 as state vice-president of the FFA. He attended Texas A&M University in College Station and graduated magna cum laude in 1984 with a Bachelor of Science in Agricultural Economics. He started a plant nursery and later became involved in cattle ranching with his family. He also owned a real estate business. For a time, he was an instructor at Trinity Valley Community College in Palestine.

Staples has two adult children from his first marriage, which ended in divorce.

Staples is a Southern Baptist deacon in his local church.

Political career
Staples served on the non-partisan Palestine City Council from 1989 to 1991. In February 1995, he was elected to the Texas House of Representatives District 11 seat in a special election to replace Elton Bomer, who had been appointed state insurance commissioner by newly elected Governor George W. Bush. In a contest against two Democrats, Staples avoided a runoff by about sixty votes, having collected 50.6 percent of the vote.

In 2000, Staples entered the race for the District 3 seat in the Texas Senate, vacated by Drew Nixon. Despite personal scandal surrounding Nixon, Staples held the seat for the Republican Party, having received more than 60 percent of the vote in the general election. He represented Anderson, Angelina, Cherokee, Hardin, Henderson, Jasper, Nacogdoches, Newton, Polk, Sabine, San Augustine, San Jacinto, Shelby and Tyler counties, and portions of Montgomery and Smith counties.

In the Senate, Staples was the chairman of the Transportation & Homeland Security Committee, the Workers Compensation Select Interim Committee and the Texas Senate Republican Caucus. Staples sponsored and helped to pass a state constitutional amendment defining marriage as between one man and one woman. He was the vice-chair of the State Affairs Committee and the Veteran Affairs & Military Installations Committee.

Staples was unopposed for the Republican nomination for Agriculture Commissioner in 2006 when the incumbent Susan Combs instead was elected Texas Comptroller to succeed Carole Strayhorn. Staples defeated Democrat Hank Gilbert and Libertarian Clay Woolam in the November 7, 2006, general election. He received 2,307,406 votes (54.77 percent), a margin of 547,000 votes over Gilbert.

In 2010, Staples ran for re-election as Agriculture Commissioner and won with more than 60 percent of the votes, again against Democrat Hank Gilbert.

Staples explained that in his role as commissioner he is compelled to tell the story of agricultural success: "It's up to us to engage with consumers because we know there are those who do not appreciate the work that's being done and what that means for available and affordable food supply."

On September 18, Staples announced his resignation to become the president of the Texas Oil & Gas Association.

2014 primary for lieutenant governor
Though Staples enlisted baseball great Nolan Ryan as his campaign chairman, he finished third in the primary for lieutenant governor with 235,981 votes (17.8 percent).

Positions

Same-sex Marriage
In 2003, Staples sponsored a bill that prohibited the State of Texas from recognizing same-sex marriages, then again in 2005, sponsored and campaigned for another bill that successfully amended the Texas Constitution to limit marriage to one man and one woman.

Electoral history
2014

2010
Texas general election, 2006: Texas Commissioner of Agriculture[4]
Party	        Candidate	          Votes	                  %	
-Republican	Todd Staples	     2,9573,406	               60.82%	
-Democratic	Hank Gilbert	     1,738,456	               35.79%	
-Libertarian	Clay Woolam	     164,035		       3.37%

Turnout	4,856,266

2006

2002

2000

2000

References

External links
 Campaign site

1963 births
Living people
People from Palestine, Texas
People from Austin, Texas
Texas A&M University alumni
Republican Party Texas state senators
Republican Party members of the Texas House of Representatives
Texas city council members
Agriculture commissioners of Texas
Ranchers from Texas
Farmers from Texas
Baptists from Texas
21st-century American politicians